The Electress of the Palatinate was the consort of the Prince-elector of the Electorate of the Palatinate, one of the Holy Roman Empire's greatest princes.

First Electorate, 1356–1648

House of Wittelsbach, Main branch, 1356–1559

House of Palatinate-Simmern, 1559–1623

House of Wittelsbach, Bavarian branch, 1623–1648

Second Electorate, 1648–1777

House of Palatinate-Simmern, 1648–1685

House of Palatinate-Neuburg, 1685–1742

House of Palatinate-Sulzbach, 1742–1799

House of Palatinate-Zweibrücken, 1799–1806

See also
List of Bavarian consorts

Sources

 
Palatinate
Lists of German nobility